Karl Bertil Sandström (25 November 1887 – 1 December 1964) was a Swedish military officer and horse rider. He competed at the 1920, 1924 and 1932 Summer Olympics in the individual dressage and won silver medals in 1920 and 1924. In 1932 he won another silver in the team dressage. In the individual event he originally placed second, but was moved to the last place for using clicking sounds to control his horse, which was not allowed.

References

External links
profile

1887 births
1964 deaths
Swedish dressage riders
Olympic equestrians of Sweden
Swedish male equestrians
Equestrians at the 1920 Summer Olympics
Equestrians at the 1924 Summer Olympics
Equestrians at the 1932 Summer Olympics
Olympic silver medalists for Sweden
Olympic medalists in equestrian
People from Gävle
Swedish Army officers
Medalists at the 1932 Summer Olympics
Medalists at the 1924 Summer Olympics
Medalists at the 1920 Summer Olympics
Sportspeople from Gävleborg County